Bjørnfjell Chapel ( or ) is a chapel of the Church of Norway in Narvik Municipality in Nordland county, Norway. It is located in the rural village of Bjørnfjell, just west of the border with Sweden. It is an annex chapel in the Bjerkvik parish which is part of the Ofoten prosti (deanery) in the Diocese of Sør-Hålogaland. The white, wooden chapel was built in a long church style in 1952 using plans drawn up by the architect Bjarne Romsloe.  The chapel is located in a rural area that is populated with vacation cabins that are popular with the residents of the town of Narvik.

Media gallery

See also
List of churches in Sør-Hålogaland

References

Narvik
Churches in Nordland
Wooden churches in Norway
20th-century Church of Norway church buildings
Churches completed in 1952
1952 establishments in Norway
Long churches in Norway